Ryan Sproul (born January 13, 1993) is a Canadian-born professional ice hockey defenceman. Born in Canada, he is currently playing with HC Kunlun Red Star of the Kontinental Hockey League (KHL) and represented China at the 2022 Winter Olympics. Sproul was drafted 55th overall by the Detroit Red Wings in the 2011 NHL Entry Draft.

Playing career

Junior
Following his first season with the Sault Ste. Marie Greyhounds of the Ontario Hockey League (OHL), Sproul was selected in the second round, 55th overall by the Detroit Red Wings in the 2011 NHL Entry Draft.

During the 2011-12 season, Sproul was the third-leading scorer for the Greyhounds and was third amongst all OHL defensemen with 54 points. Sproul recorded 23 goals and 31 assists in 61 games for the Greyhounds.

During the 2012–13 OHL season, Sproul was the Greyhounds' second-leading scorer and led all OHL defensemen with 66 points. Sproul recorded 20 goals and 46 assists in 50 games. Sproul was rewarded for his outstanding play during the season by being named to the OHL's First All-Star Team. Sproul was awarded the Max Kaminsky Trophy as the most outstanding defenceman in the Ontario Hockey League.

Professional
On March 25, 2012, the Red Wings signed Sproul to a three-year entry-level contract.

After the Greyhounds were eliminated from the playoffs, Sproul joined the Grand Rapids Griffins for two regular-season games, making his AHL debut on April 20, 2013, in a game against the Lake Erie Monsters.

During the 2013–14 season, in his first full season with the Griffins, Sproul was the second-highest scoring defenseman on the team, recording 11 goals and 21 assists in 72 games. On April 13, 2014, Sproul made his NHL debut for the Detroit Red Wings in a game against the St. Louis Blues.

On September 23, 2016, the Red Wings re-signed Sproul to a two-year contract. On October 3, 2017, Sproul was assigned to the Grand Rapids Griffins. On October 21, 2017, Sproul was traded to the New York Rangers in exchange for Matt Puempel. He was initially assigned to the Rangers' AHL affiliate, the Hartford Wolf Pack, and contributed with 10 goals and 25 points in 44 games. He was later recalled to play out the remaining season with the Rangers, collecting 5 points in 16 games.

As an unrestricted free agent, Sproul was unable to sign an NHL contract over the summer. He was invited to attend the Calgary Flames' training camp on a professional tryout. After appearing in three preseason games, he was released by the Flames on September 26. On October 14, Sproul signed a professional tryout with the Toronto Marlies. After one game, Sproul was released from his tryout. He immediately signed another tryout contract, this time with the Laval Rocket, on October 25. Sproul appeared in 11 games with the Rocket, producing 1 goal and 5 points before he was released from his tryout on November 29, 2018. On December 4, Sproul joined his third AHL club for the season, securing an AHL contract for the remainder of the campaign with the Hershey Bears, affiliate to the Washington Capitals.

International play
Due to his stint in China, Sproul was called up to represent the China men's national ice hockey team for the 2022 Winter Olympics on January 28, 2022.

Career statistics

Regular season and playoffs

International

Awards and honors

References

External links

1993 births
Living people
Canadian emigrants to China
Naturalized citizens of the People's Republic of China
Chinese ice hockey defencemen
Olympic ice hockey players of China
Canadian ice hockey defencemen
Detroit Red Wings draft picks
Detroit Red Wings players
Grand Rapids Griffins players
Hartford Wolf Pack players
Hershey Bears players
Ice hockey people from Ontario
HC Kunlun Red Star players
Laval Rocket players
New York Rangers players
Sault Ste. Marie Greyhounds players
Sportspeople from Mississauga
Toronto Marlies players
Canadian expatriate ice hockey players in China
Canadian expatriate ice hockey players in the United States
Ice hockey players at the 2022 Winter Olympics